Tytthotyle is a genus of furnace heat lubbers in the family Romaleidae. There is at least one described species in Tytthotyle, T. maculata.

References

Further reading

 

Romaleidae
Articles created by Qbugbot